The Wu Chung Library, named after Wu Chung, is located in the United College of the Chinese University of Hong Kong (CUHK). As one of the seven libraries in CUHK, the United College Library houses the Philosophy collection, major Chinese monograph series collection and General Education collection, and provides facilities including Group Study Rooms and Outdoor Reading Area.

Background 
The United College Library was first founded in 1956 and located at Caine Road, Hong Kong. In 1972, with a donation by Wu Chung, the Library was named as the Wu Chung Library and moved into its present campus in Shatin. The Library was renamed as the Wu Chung Multimedia Library to house the collection of audiovisual materials in 2001. On 1 July 2018, after distributing the multimedia collection to other CUHK Libraries according to the subject designation of the materials, the Library reverted to its original name as the Wu Chung Library.

Resources and facilities 
After transforming from a multimedia library to a humanities-based library, the Wu Chung Library now houses the collections on Philosophy, Classical Chinese Reference (AC Class) and General Education.

The redesigned library applies the frameless transparent window walls, which located on the lower ground floor and the ground floor, to merge the indoor and outdoor for users to enjoy the waterfall and greenery. The lower ground floor features a space equipped with IT facilities. The ground floor houses a cluster of computing facilities together with collaborative study space and five Group Study Rooms, as well as the Tien Chi Microcomputer Laboratory. On the first floor, it offers the Outdoor Reading Area, the Seminar Room and the Independent Learning Centre. The second floor provides further collaborative study place and six Faculty Study Rooms.

External links 

 Chinese University of Hong Kong
 United College
 United College Wu Chung Library

References 

Academic libraries in Hong Kong
Chinese University of Hong Kong
Libraries established in 1956